Geethanjali  is a soap opera that aired on Raj TV. The show stars Deepa Venkat, Nithya Ravindran, Deepak Dinkar, Rajasekar, Banumathi, Shilpa and Bharath. The serial is produced by AVM Productions and directed by A.V.M. Kumaran. The show aired Monday through Saturday at 6.30PM starting 29 December 2008, and ended on 30 December 2011 after a total of 1,078 episodes. It received top ratings and high praise from viewers.

Cast
 Nithya Ravindran as Anjali
 Deepa Venkat as Geethanjali
 Vijay Adhiraj
 Deepak Dinkar
 Rajasekar
 Banumathi
 Shilpa
 Bharath
Gayathri
 Pooja
Sumangali
Rachitha Mahalakshmi

References

External links
 Raj TV Official Site  
 Raj TV on YouTube
 Raj Television Network 

Raj TV television series
2009 Tamil-language television series debuts
2011 Tamil-language television series endings
Tamil-language television shows
2000s Tamil-language television series